The 36th Special Regiment of Aviation Transport (36 SPLT) was a special aviation regiment of the Polish Air Force, established in 1945.  All of its aircraft were for national public use, the most important being transport of Polish politicians and Ministry of National Defence highest officials & forces commanders. It was headquartered at the 1st Air Base at Warsaw Chopin Airport (formerly Okęcie). Between 1947 and 1974 it operated as Special Air Regiment, earlier as Government Transport Squadron. It was shut down in 2011 after the 2010 Polish Air Force Tu-154 crash accident report found serious deficiencies in its organization and training, and its aircraft retired.

Accidents 
On 28 February 1973 a government airliner Antonov An-24W serial number 97305702 (tail number 012), crashed in Szczecin, north-west Poland. All 18 people on board were killed (including ministers of the interior of Poland and Czechoslovakia).
On 4 December 2003 Mi-8 helicopter carrying Poland's Prime Minister Leszek Miller crashed near Warsaw, all people on board survived.

On 10 April 2010 one of two Tupolev Tu-154 airplanes (serial number 90A-837; Polish aircraft 101) crashed landed in fog at Smolensk North, Russia. All 96 on board died, including Poland's President Lech Kaczyński and 42 other officials en route to the commemoration of the 70th anniversary of the Katyn massacre nearby. The crash also took lives of the Chief of the General Staff of the Polish Army and most senior military commanding officers, the National Bank of Poland governor, the Deputy Minister of Foreign Affairs and dignitaries in the government, vice-speakers and members of the Senate of the Republic of Poland and Sejm of the Republic of Poland houses of the National Assembly of the Republic of Poland, and senior members of clergy of various denominations.

On 4 August 2011, the regiment was disbanded by the Polish Minister of National Defence as a direct consequence of the 2010 crash.  The regiment officially ceased to exist on 31 December 2011; however, the 1st Air Transport Base continues to transport government VIPs by helicopter.  Since then all Polish government officials have been using civil aircraft owned by LOT Polish Airlines, mainly two Embraer 175 operated exclusively for government.

Equipment disbandment in 2011 
Previously operated transport aircraft including Lisunov Li-2, Ilyushin Il-14, Antonov An-24 and Tupolev Tu-134.

References 

  The Picture of the Polish Tu-154M Flight Crew as Expert-Flyers Emerges: The Crew Cleared of Any Wrongdoing, by Peter Czartoryski-Sziler for "Nasz Dziennik"

Regiments of the Polish Air Force
Military units and formations established in 1945
Military units and formations disestablished in 2011